Dragan Bogdanic (born 5 July 1965 in Teslic, Yugoslavia) is a Bosnian Serb politician and Health Minister of Republika Srpska since 2013. Previously, he was a CEO  of Banja Vrucica, a medical center in Bosnia and Herzegovina.

He studied medicine in Banja Luka and Belgrade.

He is married and has one child.

"Purchase of Hicks" and other affairs
Major allegations of corruption and political abuse ensued, particularly after Bogdanović's long-term associate, Ilija Pavlović, openly spoke for the Bosnia and Herzegovina media, publicly accusing Bogdanović for wide variety of abuses of power and influence, most notably his alleged involvement in "Purchase of Hicks" controversy.

References

1965 births
Living people